Mazdavand (formerly, Marzdaran, also Romanized as Marzdārān, Mazdarān, Mozdarān, and Mozdūrān) is a city and capital of Marzdaran District, in Sarakhs County, Razavi Khorasan Province, Iran. At the 2006 census, its population was 1,028, in 248 families.

Mazdavand has an important strategic position and is considered as the entrance gate of Sarakhs. Most of the people in this city speak Persian and some others Baluchi and Turkish.

Near this village is Mazdavand cave which is of strategic importance.

References 

Populated places in Sarakhs County
Cities in Razavi Khorasan Province